Azazel, in comics, may refer to:

 Azazel (DC Comics), the demon in Neil Gaiman's Sandman
 Azazel (Marvel Comics), the biological father of Nightcrawler, created by Chuck Austen

See also
 Azazel (disambiguation)